Guronasyon Foundation Inc. National High School is a public high school situated at Bilibiran, Binangonan, Rizal.

History

GFINHS was established in 2007 aiming to diminish the increasing enrollment at its mother school, Vicente Madrigal National High School. It was named after the foundation of Congressman Michael John Duavit who donated the land where GFINHS is constructed.

It started its operation on June 4, 2007. 

On June 15, 2007, the school was officially separated from its mother school.

Curricula

The school uses two curricula, the RBEC Curriculum (for RBEC students) and the K-12 Curriculum (for the K-12 students), both using the zero-based grading system for each period.

K-12 Program

The implementation of the K-12 program is "phased". The first phase of the implementation will start on SY 2012–2013. During this school year, universal kindergarten will be finally offered, and will now be a part of the compulsory education system; and a new curriculum for Grade 1 and Grade 7 students would be introduced. By SY 2016–2017, Grade 11/Year 5 will be introduced, and Grade 12/Year 6 by SY 2017–2018; with the phased implementation of the new curriculum finished by the SY 2017–2018. Students in 2nd year to 4th year high school this SY 2012-2013 are not included in the program. It is only applicable to students from Kinder to 1st year high school which is now called Grade 7.

List of Subjects

The table below lists the subjects taken by the students of Guronasyon Foundation Inc. National High School.

Gallery

See also
Binangonan, Rizal
Rizal
Vicente Madrigal National High School

High schools in Rizal
Educational institutions established in 2007
Binangonan, Rizal
2007 establishments in the Philippines